Hemipristis (from  , 'half' and   'saw') is a genus of weasel sharks, family Hemigaleidae. It contains one extant species, the snaggletooth shark (H. elongata) and several extinct species.

Hemipristis has two distinct types of teeth in each section of its jaw. The ones on the upper jaw act as knives, cutting through the flesh of the prey, while the pointed ones on the bottom act as forks, spearing the prey and holding it down. Because this shark was poorly studied in the past and its top and bottom jaw teeth differ to such a great degree, its top and lower jaw teeth were assigned to a separate genus in the past.

Species
 Hemipristis elongata (Klunzinger, 1871)
 †Hemipristis curvatus
 †Hemipristis serra - An extinct species from the Oligocene-Miocene of Florida, South Carolina, and other areas on the Atlantic coast.

See also
 List of prehistoric cartilaginous fish

References

 
Extant Eocene first appearances
Shark genera
Taxa named by Louis Agassiz
Fish genera with one living species